A black cat is a cat with black fur.

Black Cat(s) or The Black Cat(s) may also refer to:

Places
Black Cat (Washington, D.C., nightclub)
Black Cat Bar, a bar in San Francisco, California
Black Cat Tavern, a bar in Los Angeles, California

Military
 Consolidated PBY Catalina, an American flying boat nicknamed Black Cat when painted black during World War II
 Black Cat (aircraft), an American B-24 bomber aircraft in World War II
 Black Cats (Royal Navy), the Royal Navy's helicopter display team
 Black Cat Squadron, a squadron of the Republic of China Air Force
 13th Armored Division (United States) or The Black Cats, a division of the U.S. Army in World War II
 National Security Guards or Black Cats, a counter-terrorism force in India
 Black Cat group, a counter-insurgency militant group in Sri Lanka 1989-1993

Literature
"The Black Cat" (short story), by Edgar Allan Poe
The Black Cat (Canadian magazine), a 1970 Canadian fantasy magazine
The Black Cat (US magazine), an early 20th-century American literary magazine
Black Cat (manga), a Japanese manga series later adapted into an anime
Black Cat (Marvel Comics), a comic book character first published in 1979
Black Cat (Harvey Comics), a comic book character published from 1941 to 1951
Black Cat, a 2004 novel by V. C. Andrews
The Black Cat, a 2010 novel by Martha Grimes
Black Cat, an imprint of the publisher Grove Press

Film
Black Cat Films, a series of short films made starting in 1916 by Essanay Studios
The Black Cat (1934 film), an American horror film starring Bela Lugosi and Boris Karloff
The Black Cat (1941 film), an American comedy/horror film starring Basil Rathbone and Bela Lugosi
Black Cat, a 1959 Indian Hindi film starring Balraj Sahni
The Black Cat (1981 film) (Gatto nero), an Italian film by Lucio Fulci
The Black Cat or Il gatto nero, a 1989 Italian film starring Urbano Barberini
Black Cat (1991 film), a Hong Kong film starring Jade Leung and Simon Yam
The Black Cat, a 1995 UK horror film by Rob Green
Black Cat (2007 film), a Malayalam film by Vinayan
"The Black Cat", a segment of the 1962 AIP anthology horror film Tales of Terror
"The Black Cat", a segment of the 1990 Italian anthology horror film Two Evil Eyes, directed by Dario Argento

Television
"The Black Cat" (Masters of Horror), an episode of Masters of Horror
"The Cat"/"The Black Cat", a two-episode story arc of the 1994 animated series Spider-Man

Music

Groups 
 Black Cats (band), a US-based Persian pop band

Albums
The Black Cat!, a 1970 album by Gene Ammons
Kara Kedi (English: Black Cat), a 2010 album by Serdar Ortaç
Black Cat (Never Shout Never album), 2015
Black Cat (Zucchero album), 2016

Songs
"Black Cat" (song), a 1989 song by Janet Jackson
"Black Cat", a song by Broadcast from Tender Buttons
"Black Cat", a song by Gentle Giant from Acquiring the Taste
"Black Cat", a song by Ladytron from Velocifero
"Black Cat", a song by the Living End from State of Emergency
"Black Cat", a song by Mayday Parade from A Lesson in Romantics
"Black Cat", a song by Turbo
"Black Cat", a song by Ziggy Marley from Love Is My Religion

Other uses
Black Cat (wrestler) or Victor Manuel, professional wrestler
Black Cat pirates, a group of characters in One Piece media
Black Cat Roundabout, a road intersection in the United Kingdom
Black Cat, the superhero identity of protagonist Adrien Agreste in the Korean dub of the Miraculous: Tales of Ladybug & Cat Noir series (Cat Noir in the English dub and Chat Noir in the French dub)
Sunderland A.F.C. or The Black Cats, an English football club
Black Cat, a brand of cigarettes made by the Carreras Tobacco Company
Black cat, an anarcho-syndicalist symbol
Black Cat Fireworks, a Chinese fireworks company owned by Li & Fung of Hong Kong
Black cat analogy, an analogy accounting for various disciplines, such as philosophy or theology
Ora Black Cat, a battery electric city car

See also
El Gato Negro (disambiguation)
Chat Noir (disambiguation)
Kuroneko (disambiguation)
Chorny Kot (Black Cat), a German-trained Belarusian guerrilla unit during World War II